Jeff Kaufman (born July 6, 1955) is an American film producer, director, writer, and illustrator. Kaufman produced, wrote, and directed the documentaries Every Act of Life, The State of Marriage, Father Joseph, The Savoy King: Chick Webb and the Music That Changed America, Brush With Life: The Art of Being Edward Biberman, and Education Under Fire. He also directed and produced episodes for Unsolved History, a Discovery Channel documentary television series, and the Discovery Channel special WTC 9/11: Stories from the Ruins. His other documentary films include 40 Million, which featured Nasrin Sotoudeh and other Iranian women's rights activists.

Kaufman has contributed cartoons to The New Yorker, as well as illustrations to The Los Angeles Times and The New York Times. Kaufman is married to Marcia Ross, a casting director and documentary producer.

Radio
Kaufman hosted the radio talk show "The Talk of Vermont" in Vermont for five years before moving to Los Angeles in 2000.

Filmography

See also 
Marcia Ross
List of Unsolved History episodes

References 

 Kaufman, Jeff (2020). Remembering Playwright Terrence McNally, Who Died on Wednesday. IndieWire.

External links 
 Jeff Kaufman on IMDB
 Floating World Pictures

Living people
1955 births
American documentary film producers
American talk radio hosts